Anka is a Local Government Area in Zamfara State, Nigeria.

It has an area of 2,746 km and a population of 142,280 at the 2006 census.

The postal code of the area is 890.

References

Local Government Areas in Zamfara State